Cyperus mitis is a species of sedge that is native to Asia between India in the west to China in the east.

The species was first formally described by the botanist Ernst Gottlieb von Steudel in 1855.

See also
 List of Cyperus species

References

mitis
Plants described in 1855
Taxa named by Ernst Gottlieb von Steudel
Flora of India
Flora of China
Flora of Sri Lanka
Flora of Myanmar
Flora of Thailand